The 1998 Tasmanian state election was held on 29 August 1998.

Retiring Members

Labor
 John White (Denison)

Liberal
 John Beswick (Bass)
 John Cleary (Franklin)
 Ron Cornish (Braddon)

Independent
 Bruce Goodluck (Franklin)

House of Assembly
Sitting members are shown in bold text. Tickets that elected at least one MHA are highlighted in the relevant colour. Successful candidates are indicated by an asterisk (*).

Bass
Five seats were up for election, down from seven in 1996. The Labor Party was defending three seats. The Liberal Party was defending four seats.

Braddon
Five seats were up for election, down from seven in 1996. The Labor Party was defending two seats. The Liberal Party was defending four seats. The Tasmanian Greens were defending one seat.

Denison
Five seats were up for election, down from seven in 1996. The Labor Party was defending three seats. The Liberal Party was defending three seats. The Tasmanian Greens were defending one seat.

Franklin
Five seats were up for election, down from seven in 1996. The Labor Party was defending three seats. The Liberal Party was defending two seats. The Tasmanian Greens were defending one seat. One seat had been held by Independent MHA Bruce Goodluck.

Lyons
Five seats were up for election, down from seven in 1996. The Labor Party was defending three seats. The Liberal Party was defending three seats. The Tasmanian Greens were defending one seat.

See also
 Members of the Tasmanian House of Assembly, 1996–1998
 Members of the Tasmanian House of Assembly, 1998–2002

References
Tasmanian Parliamentary Library

Candidates for Tasmanian state elections
Parliament of Tasmania